Dreamia (registered as  Dreamia - Serviços de Televisão, S.A.) is a producer of thematic channels for the Portuguese and African markets. It is a joint-venture between NOS and  AMC Networks International Iberia. It produces the channels distributed by AMC Networks International Iberia.

Dreamia channels are some of the most watched channels in Portuguese cable, with Canal Hollywood regularly surpassing RTP 2's ratings.

Channels
Canal Hollywood (HD) - All markets. Movies channel, original audio, subtitles in Portuguese.
AMC (HD) - All markets. Series/movie channel, subtitles in Portuguese.
Canal Panda (HD) - All markets - children's channel, Portuguese audio. 
Biggs - All markets - teen's channel, Portuguese audio.
Blast - Action film channel aimed at the African market with primetime films dubbed in Portuguese.
Panda Kids (HD) - All markets - children's channel, Portuguese audio.

References

Television in Portugal
Television in Angola
Television in Mozambique